There are six stadiums in use by Arizona Fall League baseball teams, all located in Arizona. The oldest is Scottsdale Stadium (1992) in Scottsdale, home of the Scottsdale Scorpions. The newest stadium is Sloan Park (2014) in Mesa, the home field of the Mesa Solar Sox. Two stadiums were built in each of the 1990s, 2000s, and 2010s. The highest seating capacity is 15,000 at Sloan Park; the lowest capacity is 10,500 at Surprise Stadium, where the Surprise Saguaros play. All stadiums have a grass surface.

Stadiums
{|class="wikitable sortable plainrowheaders"
|-
! Name
! Team(s)
! Location
! Opened
! Capacity
! class="unsortable" | Ref(s)
|-
! scope="row" | Camelback Ranch
| Glendale Desert Dogs
| Phoenix
| 2009
| align="right" | 12,000
|  
|-
! scope="row" | Peoria Sports Complex
| Peoria Javelinas
| Peoria
| 1994
| align="right" | 12,882
| 
|-
! scope="row" | Salt River Fields at Talking Stick
| Salt River Rafters
| Scottsdale
| 2011
| align="right" | 11,000
| 
|-
! scope="row" | Scottsdale Stadium
| Scottsdale Scorpions
| Scottsdale
| 1992
| align="right" | 12,000
|  
|-
! scope="row" | Sloan Park
| Mesa Solar Sox
| Mesa
| 2014
| align="right" | 15,000
|  
|-
! scope="row" | Surprise Stadium
| Surprise Saguaros
| Surprise
| 2003
| align="right" | 10,500
|  
|}

Map

Gallery

See also

List of Arizona Complex League stadiums

References

External links

 
Arizona Fall League
Arizona Fall League stadiums